The teams competing in Group 5 of the 2009 UEFA European Under-21 Championships qualifying competition are Estonia, Macedonia, Netherlands, Norway, and Switzerland.

Standings

Key:
Pts Points, Pld Matches played, W Won, D Drawn, L Lost, GF Goals for, GA Goals against, GD Goal Difference

Matches

Goalscorers

1 goal
: Kaimar Saag
: Armend Alimi, Ivan Tričkovski
: Ismaïl Aissati, Roy Beerens
: Johan Lædre Bjørdal, Tarik Elyounoussi, Arnar Førsund, Petter Bruer Hanssen, Aram Khalili 
: Frank Feltscher, Adrian Nikci, Murat Ural

Group 5